Saravanan Meenatchi is a 2011 Indian Tamil-language television series broadcast on STAR Vijay. The first season was broadcast from 7 March 2011 to 21 October 2013. The second season of the show, which started as a sequel and next generation story of the first season, was broadcast from 21 October 2013 to 15 July 2016. The third season featured a different story and cast was  broadcast from 18 July 2016 to 17 August 2018.

Casting 
Season 1
The name of the serial is derived from the names of the characters of the serial 'Madurai' starring the same lead pair.

Series

Overview

Synopsis

Season 1
The story revolves around Saravanan (Senthil Kumar) and Meenatchi (Sreeja Chandran) who are poles apart in terms of personality, background, attitudes towards life, etc. Saravanan is a Chennai-based radio jockey from an affluent family.  Meenatchi is a small-town girl from Thirunelveli, working as a teacher in a small school. The story begins as the two families meet for a marriage proposal between the two, but things go wrong and the wedding does not happen. However, Saravanan and Meenatchi find themselves falling in love with each other. The energetic spirit with which the couple handle love, marriage and life in general leads the rest of the story.

Season 2

20 years later 
 
Season 2  begins with Shakthi Saravanan (Mohammad Irfan), son of Saravanan and Meenatchi, coming to India from Canada to find a bride like his mom. He comes to his mom's village Kallidaikurichi in Tirunelveli where his maternal uncle, Tamizh (Meenatchi's elder brother), and family live. Shakthi Saravanan disguises himself and lives in Tamizh's house where he meets Tamizh's daughter, Thanga Meenatchi (Rachitha Mahalakshmi) a.k.a. "Meenatchi", and falls for her. After all oppositions from Tamizh, ultimately she too falls for Shakthi Saravanan. Tamizh is strongly against Thanga Meenatchi and Sakthi Saravanan's love due to tensions between the families in the previous generation. Because of this, Tamizh decides to marry his daughter Thanga Meenatchi to his other sister Sudha's son Saravana Perumal (Kavin) a.k.a. Vettaiyan (Shakthi Saravanan's cousin brother).

Shakthi Saravanan promises to save Thanga Meenatchi from the wedding and Vettaiyan promises not to marry her if Saravanan comes. Unfortunately, Saravanan never shows up (he gets deported back to Canada because of his visa expiration) and Vettiyan and Meenatchi get married. Meenatchi develops a strong hatred towards Vettiyan because of this sudden marriage. Meenatchi meets a guy at her college named Inba who promises to take her to Canada to meet Saravanan. His real intention is to kidnap her and rape her. Vettaiyan saves Meenatchi from Inba and his gang, and Vettaiyan himself promises Meenatchi that he will take her to Canada and unite her with Saravanan. They get really close and Meenatchi starts developing feelings for Vettaiyan without even realizing it. Although Meenatchi develops feelings for Vettaiyan, she tries to decline it.

She decides to break ties with Vettaiyan if she wants to live with Saravanan. When  Thanga Meenatchi is on the way to the temple to break all ties with Vettaiyan, she meets with an accident and loses her memory.

Thanga Meenatchi meets Vettaiyan again and starts to develop feelings for him not remembering their marriage or her previous love with Shakthi Saravanan. Vettaiyan and Meenatchi start dating, and Vettaiyan hides the truth about Saravanan from Meenatchi. Soon Meenatchi gets to know that Vettaiyan is her husband and goes home to happily live with him.

Then she learns about her past with Shakthi Saravanan and is angry with Vettaiyan. After learning more about the sacrifices and hardships Vettaiyan faced for and because of her, she heartily accepts him and they start to live together. After a few months, they bump into a lady who shares Meenatchi's name and appearance, beginning season 3.

Season 3 
 
Love blossoms between a simple middle-class boy Saravanan (Rio Raj) and a rich girl Meenatchi (Rachitha Mahalakshmi), an MBA graduate from London. Despite the differences in their background, Saravanan and Meenakshi get married and lead a happy life together.

Cast

Season 1 
 Mirchi Senthil as RJ Saravanan - Rajasekhar and Sharadha's son; Meenatchi's husband and Shakthi Saravanan's father (2011-2013)
 Sreeja Chandran as Meenatchi - Vaidyanathan and Valli's daughter; Saravanan's wife and Shakthi Saravanan's mother (2011-2013)
 Stalin Muthu as Thamizharasan "Thamizh" - Vaidyanathan and Valli's son; Meenatchi's elder brother and Soundarya's husband, Vaitheeswaran and Thanga Meenatchi's father (2011-2013)
 Ramya Ramakrishna as Soundarya - Rajasekhar and Sharadha's daughter; Saravanan's elder sister and Thamizh's wife, Vaitheeswaran and Thanga Meenatchi's mother (2011-2013)
 Rajasekar as Rajasekar - Soundarya and Saravanan's father (2011-2016)
 Kuyili as Sharadha Rajasekhar - Rajasekhar's wife; Soundarya and Saravanan's mother (2011-2016)
 Y. V. Subramaniam as Vaidhyanathan - Thamizh, Meenatchi Sudha and Ramya's father (2011-2013)
 Viji Kannan as Valli Vaidyanathan - Vaidhyanathan's wife; Thamizh, Meenatchi Sudha and Ramya's mother (2011-2013)
 Margaret Divya as Yamini - Saravanan's ex-girlfriend (2011-2013)
 Suchithra as Sudha - Vaidhyanathan and Valli's daughter; Thamizh and Meenatchi's first younger sister and Murugan's wife, Vettaiyan's mother (2011-2013)
 Kavin as Murugan - Sudha's husband and Vettaiyan's father (2011-2013)
 Sathya Sai Krishna (2011) / Shamily Sukumar (2012-2013) as Ramya - Vaidhyanathan and Valli's daughter Thamizh and Meenatchi's second younger sister and Jeeva's wife
 Syed Anwar Ahmed as Jeeva - Ramya's husband (2011-2013)
 S. N. Lakshmi as Aachi - Vaidhyanathan's mother; Thamizh, Meenatchi Sudha and Ramya's grandmother (2011-2012)
 Sangeetha as Amudha (2011-2012)
 Rajkumar as Subramani - a man who loves Meenatchi one-sidedly (2011-2012)
 Manoj Kumar as Arjun - Ramya's ex-lover (2012)
 Mirchi Shah as Shah - Saravanan's best friend (2011-2013)
 Suzane George as Malliga - Thamizh's ex-girlfriend (2012)
 Gayatri Bhuvanesh as Akilandeshwari (2012)
 Krithika Ladoo (2012)
 Subhashini Kannan (2012)

Season 2 
 
 Rachitha Mahalakshmi as Thanga Meenatchi "Meenatchi" - Thamizh and Soundarya's daughter; Shakthi Saravanan's ex-lover and Vettaiyan's wife (2013-2016)
  Kavin as Saravana Perumal alias Vettaiyan - Sudha and Murugan's son, Shakthi Saravanan's cousin brother and Thanga Meenatchi's husband, Kalai 's ex-lover (2013-2016)
 Mohamed Irfan (2013-2014) as Shakthi Saravanan - Saravanan and Meenatchi's son; Thanga Meenatchi's ex-lover
 Prem Kumar (2014) as Shakthi Saravanan 
 V. J. Chitra as Kalaiyarasi "Kalai" - Vettaiyan's ex-lover  (2013-2016)
 Myna Nandhini as Revathi alias "Mynaa" - Thanga Meenatchi's best friend (2013-2016)
 Deepa Nethran as Sudha - Vettaiyan's mother (2013-2016)
 Kumara Moorthi as Douglas Vettaiyan's best friend (2013-2016)
 Alagesh as Thamizh - Vaitheeswaran and Thanga Meenatchi's father (2013-2016)
 Lakshmi Vasudevan as Soundharya Vaitheeswaran and Thanga Meenatchi's mother (2013-2016)
 Siddharth Kumaran as Vaitheeswaran - Thanga Meenatchi's elder brother; Janani's ex-lover and Tulasi's husband (2013-2016)
 Divya Prabhu (2013-2015) / Pavithra Janani (2015-2016) as in a Dual Role
 Janani - Anbuarasan's elder daughter, Vaitheeswaran's ex- lover (2013-2015) (Dead)
 Tulasi - Anbuarasan's younger daughter, Janani's twin and Vaitheeswaran's wife (2015-2016)
 Karthik as Pandi - a man who loves Thanga Meenatchi one-sidedly (2013-2016)
 Kuyili as Sharadha (2013-2016)
 Rajasekar as Rajasekar (2013-2016)
 Raghavan as Arunachalam - Janani and Tulasi's father (2013-2016)
 Priya as Priya - Shakthi Saravanan's friend (2013-2014)
 Inba as Inba (2014)
 Shyam as Gautham (2014)

Season 3 
 
 Rachitha Mahalakshmi as Meenatchi Saravanan (2016-2018) / Vedhavalli (2018): Saravanan's wife, Lakshmi's first daughter and Veluchamy's Second daughter in law and (Vedhavalli character in Past)
 Rio Raj as Saravanan Veluchamy: Ramasamy's Grandson; Meenatchi's husband, Veluchamy's Second son and Muthazhagu's ex-fiancé (2016-2018)
 Gayathri Yuvraj as Muthazhagu Sankarapandi: Sankarapandi's wife; Palani's first daughter and Raji's best friend, Saravanan's ex-fiancé (2016-2018)
 Ravi Chandran as Veluchamy: Ramasamy's son; Sankarapandi, Saravanan, Sathya, Raji's father and Deivanai's husband and Palani's brother and Maruthu's best friend (2016-2018)
 Senthi Kumari as Deivanai Veluchamy: Sankarapandi, Saravanan, Sathya, Raji's father and Veluchamy's wife; Ramasamy's daughter in law (2016-2018)
 Rajasekar as Ramasamy: Veluchamy and Palani's father; Sankarapandi, Saravanan, Sathya and Raji's Grand father (2016-2018)
 Sankarapandi as Sankarapandi Veluchamy: Veluchamy's first son; Saravanan, Sathya and Raji's elder brother ; Muthazhagu's husband (2016-2018)
 Deepa Shankar as Pazhaniyammal [Pazhani]: Veluchamy's sister and Ramasamy's daughter; Muthazhagu and Thangam's mother (Main Female Comedian) (2016-2018)
 Samantha as Sathyavathi Sakthivel a.k.a.[Sathya]: Sankarapandi's younger sister and Saravanan and Raji's elder sister, Veluchamy's first daughter; Sakthivel's wife (2016-2018)
 Rajkumar as Sakthivel: Sathya's husband (Main Male Comedian) (2016-2018)
 Pavithra Janani as Rajeswari Veluchamy a.k.a. [Raji]:  Veluchamy's Second daughter; Sankarapandi, Sathya and Saravanan's younger sister and Randi's love interest (2016-2018)
 Meenakshi Govindarajan as Thangam a.k.a. Thangameenatchi: Palani's second daughter, Muthazhagu's younger sister and Kathir's lover (2016-2018)
 Vishnu Unnikrishnan as Kathirvel Saravanan [Kathir]: Thangam's lover (2017-2018)
 Lakshmi as Lakshmi Marudupandi: Marudu's wife; Meenatchi, Randi and Jyothi's mother (2016-2018)
 Gnanasambandan as Marudupandi a.k.a. Marudu: Veluchamy's best friend and Lakshmi's husband; Meenatchi, Randi and Jyothi's father (2016-2018)
 Rindhya as Nandhini / Malathy: Vedhavalli's Foe (2018)
 Suchithra as Jyothi, Maruthu's Younger daughter; Meenatchi and Randi's younger sister (2016-2018)
 Britto as Rathnavel Pandi [Randi]: Maruthu's son and Meenatchi's younger brother; Raji's love interest (2016-2018)
 Anbarasan as Anbarasu: Lakshmi's brother; Meenatchi's uncle and Karthi's father (2016-2018)
 Suzan George as Raadhika: Sankarapandi's ex-fiancé (2016-2018)
 Shivani Narayanan as Gayatri: Saravanan and Swetha's friend;  Also a Participant in Kitchen Competition (2017)
 Myna Nandhini as Madonna: Meenatchi's best friend (2016-2017)
 V. J. Chitra as Veni: (Ghost) Killed by Lakshmi and her brother; so she take a revenge against Meenatchi's family (2017)
 Vadivukkarasi as (Judge) (2017)
 Rhema Ashok as Swetha: Gayatri and Saravanan's friend but initially she doesn't like Saravanan. Also a Participant in Kitchen Competition (2017)
 Karthi as Karthi: Anbarasu's son  and Meenatchi's ex-fiancé (2016-2018)
 Kumara Moorthi as Kuruvilla, Saravanan's best friend (2016-2018)
 Franklin as Gnanamani, Saravanan's best friend (2016-2018)
 Vasu Vikram as Renganathan: Kathir's father (2018)
 Nithya Ravindran as Sivakami Ammal: Kathir's mother (2018)
 Saai Gayatri as (Host) (2017)
 V.J. Andrews as (Host) and Saravanan's friend (2017)

Reception 
Saravanan Meenatchi season 1 attracted high viewership ratings during its broadcast in 2011–2013. The series was a major hit sin India and Sri Lanka and received immense popularity by Tamilians across the world. Season 1 of the series was the no 1 serial in TN for several weeks and also it was the first non- Sun TV serial to the top charts maintaining its no 1 position in top 3 till end. The cast members quickly became household names, several of them the faces of various endorsements and advertisements. The wedding of Saravanan Meenatchi was even conducted in real time and at a real place with much fanfare. The marriage was held in Karaikudi. In fact, invitations and sweet packets were distributed among the people of Karaikudi. The marriage episode was telecast for two-and-half-hours in Chennai, and the TRP ratings shot up to 10 in Chennai, and 6.4 all over Tamil Nadu.

After the series ended,  Mirchi Senthil and Sreeja Chandran got married on 2 July 2014 in Tirupati. It was a family affair and no celebs were present.

Sequels

Season 2 
 

Season 2 begins with Shakthi Saravanan who returns to India as Saravanan and Meenakshi's son, 20 years after his parents went overseas. He wants to search for a bride who is like his mother.

Main cast
 Kavin as Saravana Perumal a.k.a. Vettaiyan
 Rachitha Mahalakshmi as Thanga Meenatchi "Meenatchi"
 Mohammad Irfan as Shakthi Saravanan

Season 3 
 

Love blossoms between a simple middle-class boy Saravanan and a rich girl Meenatchi, an MBA graduate from London. Despite the differences in their background, Saravanan and Meenakshi get married and lead a happy life together.

Main cast
 Rachitha Mahalakshmi as Meenatchi 
 Rio Raj as Saravanan
 Gayathri Yuvaraj as Muthazhagu

Awards and nominations
All of Saravanan Meenatchi season 1 awards are listed here.
The serial was awarded 'Best Serial', 'Best Male Actor', 'Best Female Actor', 'Best Director' and 'Best Character Actor' at the 43rd annual awards function organized by Mylapore Academy.

Adaptations

International broadcast
The Series was released on 7 November 2011 on Vijay TV. The Show was also broadcast internationally on Channel's international distribution.
 It was aired in Sri Lanka, Singapore, Vietnam, Japan, Hong Kong, United States, Europe, Malaysia, Mauritius and South Africa on Vijay TV.
 In Canada, the drama aired on Tamil Canadians-oriented channel on Asian Television Network 9:30 hours after its original Tamil Nadu broadcast with English Subtitle.
 In Sri Lanka Tamil Channel on Shakthi TV. It was aired Monday through Friday at 7:30PM (SST) with Sinhalese subtitles.

References

External links
Official website

Star Vijay original programming
Tamil-language romance television series
Tamil-language comedy television series
2010s Tamil-language television series
2011 Tamil-language television series debuts
Tamil-language television shows
2013 Tamil-language television seasons
2018 Tamil-language television series endings